Mount Idaho is a ghost town the western United States, located in Idaho County, Idaho. The town served as county seat of Idaho County from 1875 to 1902.

History 
A  stretch of trail opened in 1860 in the Mount Idaho area is believed to be one of the earliest examples of a toll road on record in the region. According to local legend, the owner of this road, Mose Milner, was forced to sell the area to Loyal P. Brown after being permanently disabled in a fight with a mountain lion. Brown is considered the founder of Mount Idaho.

The town of Mount Idaho was founded around 1862 as an outpost serving nearby gold mining areas. By 1873 Mount Idaho was connected by stagecoach with Lewiston.

During the Nez Perce War of 1877, a hotel in Mount Idaho served as a hospital. Some of the dead from that conflict were buried in the town's cemetery. The Battle of White Bird Canyon was fought nearby on June 17.

The county seat was moved from Mount Idaho to Grangeville ten years later. By 1922, when the town's post office closed, Mount Idaho had been effectively assimilated by Grangeville.

References

External links
Mount Idaho - Idaho Ghost Town

Geography of Idaho County, Idaho
Ghost towns in Idaho
Ghost towns in Idaho County, Idaho